Re Tottenham Hotspur plc [1994] 1 BCLC 655 is a UK company law case concerning unfair prejudice under s 459 of the Companies Act 1985, now s 994 Companies Act 2006.

Facts
In 1993 both Mr Alan Sugar and Mr Terry Venables had a 50-50 interest in Tottenham Hotspur plc. They agreed Mr Sugar would be the chairman and Mr Venables would be the chief executive. Subsequently, there was a rights issue. 48% of Tottenham Hotspur plc's shares were held by Amshold Ltd by Mr Sugar. 23% were controlled by Mr Venables through Edennote plc. Mr Sugar had a majority of voting shares. Mr Sugar and Mr Venables fell out. Mr Venables was removed from his position as chief executive through a majority vote on the board of directors. Mr Venables, through Edennote plc began a s 459 petition, on the basis that both had been under agreement from 1991 that he would participate in management, and that Mr Sugar had breached this agreement by taking control of the company. Edennote alleged that it had a legitimate expectation that Mr Venables would participate in the affairs of the company on the basis of shared control even after the rights issue.

Judgment

See also
Re Blue Arrow plc [1987] BCLC 585
Fulham Football Club Ltd v Cabra Estates plc

Notes

United Kingdom company case law
1993 in case law
1993 in British law
Tottenham Hotspur F.C.